Ei Lu Baung Twin is a 1958 Burmese black-and-white drama film, directed by Shwe Done Bi Aung starring Htun Wai, Maung Maung Ta, Myint Myint Khin and Shwe Man Aung Gyi.

Cast
Htun Wai as Thant Zin
Maung Maung Ta as Ye Win
Myint Myint Khin as Myint Myint
Shwe Man Aung Gyi as Kyauk Lone
Nwet Nwet Aye as Nwet Nwet Aye
Than Than Nu as Ma Ma Gyi

References

1958 films
1950s Burmese-language films
Films shot in Myanmar
Burmese black-and-white films
1958 drama films
Burmese drama films